Imperio de Mérida Club Polideportivo is a Spanish football club based in Mérida, in the autonomous community of Extremadura. Founded in 1955 it holds home games at Estadio Romano, with a capacity for 15,000 spectators.

In 2011, after seven consecutive seasons in Tercera División, the club ceased to compete in organized football.

Season to season

9 seasons in Tercera División

References

External links
Fexfutbol team profile 

Football clubs in Extremadura
Mérida, Spain
Association football clubs established in 1955
1955 establishments in Spain